Idrettsforeningen Frisk Asker is a Norwegian sports club from Asker, Akershus. It has sections for association football and ice hockey. It also used to play bandy.

Ice hockey

The men's ice hockey team are one of Norway's leading teams. Their home arena is Askerhallen. They have won three championships.

Football
The football section has struggled in the later years. The women's section has cooperated with Bødalen IF and Vollen UL to form a team called Amasone Asker FK, established on 8 March 2009. The club does not currently field a men's team.

References

External links
 Official site

 
Sports teams in Norway
Football clubs in Norway
Association football clubs established in 1922
Ice hockey clubs established in 1922
Bandy clubs established in 1922
Multi-sport clubs in Norway
1922 establishments in Norway
Defunct bandy clubs in Norway